Hiruhārama is a village and rural community in the Gisborne District of New Zealand's North Island. It is located just south of Ruatoria and north of Makarika, on State Highway 35.

The area has two marae. Hiruharama Marae and Kapohanga a Rangi meeting house is a meeting place of the Ngāti Porou hapū of Te Aitanga a Mate and Te Aowera. Te Aowera Marae and Te Poho o Te Aowera meeting house is a meeting place of Te Aowera. Hiruharamahas the best kai.

Wiremu Parker, New Zealand's first Māori news broadcaster, was raised and educated in Hiruharama and nearby Makarika.

Education
Hiruharama School is a Year 1-8 co-educational public primary school. In 2019, it was a decile 1 school with a roll of 143.

References

Populated places in the Gisborne District